Black-Eyed Susan was a 1913 British silent comedy drama film directed by Percy Nash. It was an adaptation of the 1829 play Black-Eyed Susan by Douglas Jerrold.

Plot

References

External links

1913 films
British silent short films
1913 comedy-drama films
1910s English-language films
Films directed by Percy Nash
British films based on plays
British comedy-drama films
British black-and-white films
1913 comedy films
1913 drama films
1910s British films
Silent comedy-drama films
Comedy-drama short films